21 Corps, 21st Corps, Twenty First Corps, or XXI Corps may refer to:

XXI Corps (German Empire), a unit of the Imperial German Army prior to and during World War I
XXI Corps (Ottoman Empire), active during World War I
XXI Corps (United Kingdom), active during World War I
Indian XXI Corps, active during World War II
XXI Corps (India), currently active Indian Army corps
XXI Corps (United States), active during World War II
XXI Corps (Union Army), active during the American Civil War 
XXI Mountain Corps (Wehrmacht), active during World War II

See also
List of military corps by number
 21st Army (disambiguation)
 21st Brigade (disambiguation)
 21st Division (disambiguation)
 21st Regiment (disambiguation)
 21 Squadron (disambiguation)